George William Benson (1808–1879) was an American Quaker abolitionist from Connecticut who assisted Prudence Crandall in her education efforts. His father George Benson (Sr.) (1752–1836) was also active in opposing slavery. He was one of the founders of the utopian Northampton Association for Education and Industry, and was the brother-in-law of William Lloyd Garrison.  Sojourner Truth, who worked for him for a time as a housekeeper, was introduced to Garrisonian abolitionism in his home, which Crandall called an "asylum for the oppressed."

References

1808 births
1879 deaths
American abolitionists
American Quakers
Quaker abolitionists